The Peacekeeper is a 1997 action film directed by Frédéric Forestier, and starring Dolph Lundgren, Michael Sarrazin, Montel Williams, and Roy Scheider. The film follows U.S. Air Force Major Frank Cross, who is the only man who can prevent the president being assassinated. He must also prevent an impending nuclear holocaust. The threat is from a terrorist group, which has stolen the President's personal communications computer; it has the capability of launching the U.S. arsenal. The film was shot on location in the city of Montreal, Quebec.

Plot
United States Air Force Major Frank Cross is in trouble with the "brass" again, after making an unauthorized humanitarian relief flight, dropping sacks of rice to starving Kurds. The press considers him a hero, requiring him by the President's side during his election campaign and thus preventing the Pentagon from court-martialling him. Instead, they assign him to carry the "black bag", the President's high-tech briefcase containing the "go codes" and communications computer for launching America's nuclear ICBM arsenal in case of a national emergency.

However, on his first day on the job in Chicago a team of mercenaries manages to steal the black bag. Cross, however, manages to fake his death and infiltrate the mercenaries. Thinking they have seen the last of him, they fly with a helicopter from the rooftops of Chicago into the night sky and onwards to their final target: United States Intercontinental Ballistic Missile Facility K-7. A disguised Cross slips into the missile silo as the team murders the silo personnel and takes over the launch control using the secret codes contained in the black bag.
 
They are led by ex-Marine Colonel Douglas Murphy, whose unit was sent to kill Saddam Hussein during an undercover operation in Iraq before Operation Desert Storm and was then exterminated by the President, who was Army Chief at the time, for political reasons. Driven by revenge, he launches a terrifying warning shot and sends a Peacekeeper nuclear missile that destroys Mount Rushmore, killing thousands. Only then does Murphy make his chilling demand: unless the President kills himself in front of a live television audience, Washington D.C. will be destroyed.

All attempts to stop one of the missiles from leaving the silo fail. Finally, the President gives in to Murphy's demand, only to realise that Murphy lied to humiliate him, so that he then should helplessly watch Washington be destroyed as Murphy helplessly had to watch his unit be destroyed against his will by the President. At the first opportunity, however, Frank acts against the terrorists and, with the help of the last surviving member of the silo, Lt. Colonel Northrop, he is able to kill the mercenaries and prevent the destruction of Washington in the nick of time.

Cast

 Dolph Lundgren as Major Frank Cross 
 Michael Sarrazin as Lieutenant Colonel Douglas Murphy 
 Montel Williams as Lieutenant Colonel Northrop 
 Roy Scheider as President Robert Baker 
 Christopher Heyerdahl as Hettinger 
 Allen Altman as McGarry 
 Martin Neufeld as Decker 
 Monika Schnarre as Jane Cross
 Michael Caloz as Billy Cross
 Tim Post as Nelson 
 Carl Alacchi as Holbrook 
 Chip Chuipka as Davis 
 Roc LaFortune as Abbott 
 Gouchy Boy as Robinson 
 Phil Chiu as Kong
 Michel Perron as Space Command Controller
 Serge Houde as Secretary of Defence
 David Francis as Major General Harding
 Vlasta Vrana as General Douglas
 Frank Fontaine as General Greenfield
 David Nichols as General Joseph
 Mark Camacho as Presidential Aide #1
 Susan Glover as Presidential Aide #2
 Larry Day as Secret Service Agent Maxwell
 Alan Fawcett as Secret Service Agent Samuels
 Philip Pretten as Secret Service Agent Clark
 Andy Bradshaw as Secret Service Agent Johnson

External links

References

1997 action films
1997 films
American action films
Canadian action films
English-language Canadian films
Films about nuclear war and weapons
Films about terrorism
Films directed by Frédéric Forestier
1990s English-language films
1990s American films
1990s Canadian films